The Musicians Union of Ghana (MUSIGA) is an umbrella group that unites all musicians in Ghana irrespective of life music genre.

Bice Osei Kuffour  was the former president of the Musicians Union of Ghana (MUSIGA). He was elected on August 18, 2011, in Tamale in the Northern Region of the country. The other candidates were Gyedu-Blay Ambolley, Nana Tuffour and Willi Roi. Before that Diana Hopeson served as the MUSIGA president from 2007 to 2011

Controversy 
In 2019, the union was dragged to court by Ras Caleb Appiah-Levi who served as the Accra Regional Chairman of MUSIGA, alleged some irregularities concerning the election process. An Accra High Court placed an interim injunction on the national elections by the union.

See also 
 Ghana Music Rights Organization

References 

Music organisations based in Ghana
Non-profit organisations based in Ghana